Bruzzano Zeffirio is a comune (municipality) in the Province of Reggio Calabria in the Italian region Calabria, located about  southwest of Catanzaro and about  southeast of Reggio Calabria.

Its territory is included in the Aspromonte National Park.

References

Cities and towns in Calabria